Mir Mohammad Alikhan, is a Pakistani investment banker based in Karachi, Pakistan. He is known for working on Wall Street, where he founded an investment bank.

Khan is also known for co-founding AMZ MAK Capital along with Aref Mohammed al-Zarouni and currently serves its co-chairman. He is also the founder of an education company called Mind and Markets.

Biography 
Khan was born into a family who are part of royal family of Mir Osman Ali Khan. His grandfather, Syed Ali Asghar Bilgrami, served as a governor of five provinces.

He studied at Sharfabad Government School for the first few years of his education and then moved to St. Patrick's High School, Karachi. Growing up in Pakistan, Khan was interested to join the Pakistan Armed Forces and wanted to become a pilot, but decided against it because of his mother's disapproval.

At the age of 19, he moved to the United States of America along with his family. Khan worked for two years at a video rental store while he was a student at Rutgers University between 1985 and 1989.

While in the United States, he started an investment bank and became the first Muslim to own an investment bank on Wall Street. He is also known for starting the Islamic Benchmark Index and introducing Islamic banking in the United States.

Khan was charged by Security and Exchange Commission (SEC) on May 17, 1999, and by Manhattan Grand Jury on May 17, 1999  for defrauding the investors. He become fugitive from the US law by the time all the various legal agencies were ready to arrest him, Khan had disappeared with his wife and two young sons, leaving Gross and Kohli, his wife's brother, to face the consequences of the firm's collapse. According to him, he was targeted for being a Muslim working in a financial sector in United States of America.

In September 2013, his holding company, AMZ MAK Capital, acquired Investor Guide 360 for an undisclosed amount.

In 2016, he founded an education company  called Mind And Markets.

References

Living people
1965 births
Pakistani stock traders
Pakistani businesspeople
Pakistani emigrants to the United States
Pakistani people of Hyderabadi descent
University of Karachi alumni
People from Karachi